Cornelis Willem (Kees) Bolle (December 2, 1927 - October 14, 2012) was a Dutch historian who was Professor of the History of Religions at the University of California, Los Angeles.

Biography
Kees W. Bolle was born in Dordrecht, Netherlands on 2 December 1927. He studied theology at Leiden University, and the history of religion and Sanskrit at the universities of Chicago and Madras. He received his PhD in the history of religion at the University of Chicago in 1961. Bolle wrote his thesis in India and was supervised by Mircea Eliade.

After gaining his PhD, Bolle lectured at Brown University. In the 1960s, Bolle was appointed Professor of the History of Religion at the University of California, Los Angeles (UCLA). Here he set up a nationally recognized undergraduate major in the interdisciplinary study of religion Bolle retired as Professor Emeritus in 1991, and subsequently moved to Portland, Oregon, and then moved to Maine in 2000 where he died on October 14, 2012.

Selected works
 The Freedom of Man in Myth, 1968
 The Persistence of Religions, 1971
 The Enticement of Religion, 2002
 Religion Among People, 2017

Sources
 
 

1927 births
2012 deaths
Brown University faculty
Dutch emigrants to the United States
Dutch historians of religion
Leiden University alumni
People from Dordrecht
University of California, Los Angeles faculty
University of Madras alumni